Benjamin Franklin Reese (September 23, 1885 – January 4, 1943) was an American Negro league pitcher in the 1910s.

A native of Newberry, South Carolina, Reese made his Negro leagues debut in 1911 with the Cuban Giants. He went on to play for the Brooklyn All Stars of the Western Independent Clubs in 1914. Reese died in Syracuse, New York in 1943 at age 57.

References

External links
  and Seamheads

1885 births
1943 deaths
Cuban Giants players
Baseball pitchers
Baseball players from South Carolina
People from Newberry, South Carolina
20th-century African-American people